Bizarre Ride II the Pharcyde is the debut album by American hip hop collective The Pharcyde, released on November 24, 1992, through the Delicious Vinyl and EastWest labels. The album was produced by former group member J-Swift, and features only one guest appearance, provided by little-known Los Angeles rapper Bucwheed (known then as "Buckwheat" from The Wascals). In the years after its release, Bizarre Ride has been hailed by music critics and alternative hip hop fans, as a classic hip hop album along with Souls of Mischief's 93 'til Infinity, and has appeared in numerous publications' "best albums" lists.

Released during the dominant Gangsta rap era of West Coast hip hop, Bizarre Ride was described as "refreshing" due to its playful, light-hearted humor and lush, jazzy production. Along with albums such as To Whom It May Concern... by Freestyle Fellowship, and I Wish My Brother George Was Here by Del tha Funkee Homosapien, Bizarre Ride helped establish a new alternative scene on the West Coast, followed by artists such as Hieroglyphics, The Coup and Jurassic 5. Despite its wide critical acclaim, the album produced only moderate sales, peaking at No. 75 on the Billboard 200 album chart in 1993. However, on the strength of the second single, "Passin' Me By", the album was certified gold in sales by the Recording Industry Association of America (RIAA) on March 28, 1996.

Conception

Background 
High school friends "Slimkid3" (Tre Hardson), "Imani" (Emandu Wilcox) and "Bootie Brown" (Romye Robinson) began their career in the entertainment industry as dancers and choreographers under the moniker "Two For Two", making numerous appearances in music videos. Their most notable exposure came with a short stint on the television show In Living Color. While working on the show, the group met their future manager Suave, then a road manager for Candyman and Tone Loc. The trio met Derrick "Fatlip" Stewart and producer John "J-Swift" Martinez at an after-school music program called South Central Unit. The program's teacher, Reggie Andrews, taught the group about essential elements of the music industry, and later oversaw the group's writing and recording sessions. While attending SCU, the group recorded their first demo tape, which included the track "Ya Mama". In 1991, the group signed a deal with Delicious Vinyl Records, following a performance of the track "Ya Mama" at an artist showcase. Soon after, the group made their first notable appearance, with the track "Soul Flower", released on the Heavy Rhyme Experience album by the Brand New Heavies.

Recording 
The four emcees, along with producer J-Swift, began recording their debut album in 1991 at the Hollywood Sounds studio in California, with Delicious Vinyl Records head Michael Ross overseeing the project as Executive Producer. J-Swift produced 10 songs and five interludes—15 of the album's 16 tracks. Before the completion of the album, Swift had a falling-out with the group over internal problems. He claimed that he was not properly compensated for his work, and that the other group members had tried to take production credit, when he had crafted all the beats himself. After leaving Pharcyde, J-Swift began a crack cocaine habit, which he has yet to completely recover from. In a 2006 interview with Mass Appeal Magazine, Swift stated:

Now without a producer or a finished product, the group recruited local producer L.A. Jay to craft the album's final recording, "Otha Fish", which was also co-produced by SlimKid3.

The group left a song off the album called "My Man", due to it never being finished and the label deciding to wrap the album because of inner group conflicts. According to Bootie Brown, there were 4 or 5 other songs that were intended to go on the record as well that didn't get recorded.

Music

Lyrical content 
Much of the album's acclaim was due to the eccentric, comedic content provided by the four emcees, who were described as a "pack of class clowns set loose in a studio" by Rolling Stone. The album's wacky storytelling and light-hearted playfulness provided an alternative to the pessimistic, hardcore hip hop that had ruled the scene at the time. Due to its light lyrical content, the album has been described as an extension of the "Daisy Age", established by De La Soul and the Native Tongues Posse. AllMusic described the group's rapping as "amazing", and stated, "The L.A.-based quartet introduced listeners to an uproarious vision of earthy hip-hop informed by P-Funk silliness and an everybody-on-the-mic street-corner atmosphere that highlights the incredible rapping skills of each member." Instead of focusing on the troubles of the inner city, the quartet use their verses to provide humorous first-person narratives, with varying topics. On the album opener "Oh Shit", SlimKid, Imani and Fatlip trade embarrassing tales about drunken antics, unusual sex partners and transsexuals. SlimKid, Imani and guest rapper Buckwheat use the song "On the DL" to vent personal stories that they'd like to be kept "on the down-low", with topics including masturbation and murder. On the single "4 Better or 4 Worse", Fatlip dedicates an entire verse to prank calling, in which the rapper spouts insane and psychotic threats while a confused female victim continually threatens to call the police. The group's debut single "Ya Mama", described by the Rolling Stone Album Guide as the album's most memorable track, calling it a "marathon game of the dozens", sees the four rappers trading comical insults towards each other's mothers.
An online reviewer comments on the group's humorous rapping style:

While the majority of the album has a focus on comedic stories, the song "Officer" touches on the topic of racial profiling. "Otha Fish" finds the group rising up and moving on from their past hang-ups as described in the previous track, "Passing Me By", the album's hit single. On the song, the four recount heartbreaking tales of school-boy crushes that had eluded them. Their mix of humor and social insight was one factor in the album's acclaim. An editorial reviewer comments on the group's unique style:

Production 
Bizarre Ride also featured the acclaimed production work of J-Swift, who provides the album with a lush, jazzy soundscape through use of live instrumentation and sampling. Swift relied on a large number of samples, by artists including James Brown, Donald Byrd, Sly & the Family Stone, The Meters, Quincy Jones, Jimi Hendrix, Roy Ayers and Marvin Gaye. Aside from the samples, Swift also provided piano, bass and rhodes on the album, and fellow producer JMD provided drum arrangements. These upbeat key arrangements and quick-paced drum loops provide much of the backdrop for the rapper's animated lyrical deliveries. Allmusic calls the album's production "easily some of the tightest and most inventive of any hip-hop record of the era." NME magazine stated, "The Pharcyde use jazz samples and phat beats to the ultimate effect: to create their own sonic Utopia.". An online review describes the album's unique musical atmosphere and layered production:

Singles 
Bizarre Ride II the Pharcyde featured four singles, all of which were accompanied by music videos. The group's debut single, "Ya Mama", which was originally released in 1991, was then re-packaged by Delicious Vinyl in 1992, with two additional songs, "I'm That Type of Nigga" and "Soul Flower". Though the song landed the group their record deal, it failed to reach any Billboard singles chart. Their first major exposure came with the release of the album's second single, "Passin' Me By". Utilizing a sample from Quincy Jones' "Summer in the City", the song became the group's biggest crossover hit, peaking at No. 52 on the Billboard Hot 100 chart, and No. 1 on the Hot Rap Singles chart. The song was later featured on the soundtrack to, and in Adam Sandler's 1999 film Big Daddy. The song is now considered a classic hip hop single, and was later included on comprehensive hip hop compilation albums like The Hip Hop Box and Hip Hop Gold. The album's third single, "4 Better or 4 Worse", was released in mid-1993, and featured the stoner song "Pack the Pipe" and the throwback track "Return of the B-Boy" as its B-Side. The single did not reach any Billboard chart. The final single, the SlimKid solo track "Otha Fish", was released in late 1993. The song became the second charting single from the album, though not as highly placed as "Passing Me By", reaching only the Hot Dance Music/Maxi-Singles Sales chart. The song "Oh Shit" was featured in the 2013 video game Saints Row IV.

A number of tracks from the album were later remixed. "Ya Mama", "Soul Flower", "Otha Fish",and "Passing Me By" all featured a number of remixes, which were later included on the 2005 Pharcyde compilation album Sold My Soul: The Remix & Rarity Collection.

Reception 

At the time of its release, Bizarre Ride received mostly positive, though at times, mixed reviews. In the years following its release, critical reaction became increasingly more positive. A number of music publications have since recognized the album as a classic. Bizarre Ride was listed on Pitchfork Media's "Top 100 Favorite Records of the 90s", and was also featured in the 2005 publication 1001 Albums You Must Hear Before You Die, in which it is stated:

Hip hop magazine The Source originally gave the album a humble 3½ (out of 5) mic rating, but in 1998, included Bizarre Ride on their 100 Best Rap Albums list. Allmusic gave the album a perfect 5 Star rating, while Rolling Stone and Q both gave Bizarre Ride positive 4 Star ratings.

An Ink Blot Magazine review called Bizarre Ride "the most fun album ever", and stated:

NME (December 25, 1993, p. 67) – Ranked No. 39 in New Musical Express' list of 'The Top 50 LPs Of 1993' – "... a cartoon-strip of blunt-smoking antics, sexual innuendo and unashamed political incorrectness, crammed with infectious funky beats ..."

In November 2010, Kanye West named the album as his 'favorite album of all time'. The album was also a formative influence on the Beta Band, whose Steve Mason also cites it as a favourite.

Influence 
While alternative East Coast hip hop albums, such as De La Soul's 3 Feet High and Rising ultimately sold over a million copies, there was no equivalent from the West Coast. With Bizarre Ride, The Pharcyde became one of the first alternative acts on the West Coast to sell large numbers of albums. Though Bizarre Ride did reach Gold status, the album's sales paled in comparison to West Coast G-funk releases of the era, such as The Chronic by Dr. Dre and Doggystyle by Snoop Dogg.

While Bizarre Ride sparked the career of The Pharcyde, the group did not attempt to capitalize on the album's reception. Following the release, the group set out on the Lollapalooza tour, and waited almost three years to release their second album, Labcabincalifornia. While the album featured two highly regarded hit singles, "Runnin'" and "Drop", it received mixed reviews. Critics weighed the album against their debut, and some felt Labcabincalifornia fell victim to the sophomore jinx. Group member Bootie Brown later stated in a 2005 interview:

Following the release of Labcabincalifornia, member Fatlip split from The Pharcyde, and the group did not return until 2000, releasing the album Plain Rap to mediocre reviews. Though the album marked the first collaboration between the group and J-Swift, Bootie Brown and Imani had a falling out with SlimKid (now known by his birth name Tre Hardson), before the album was released, turning the group into a duo. In 2004, Imani and Bootie released the group's fourth album, Humboldt Beginnings, receiving little attention and harsh reviews. Tre and Fatlip have both since released solo albums, but no project released by the group or its members since their debut has been able to reach the acclaim of Bizarre Ride.

Track listing 
All tracks produced by J-Swift, except "Otha Fish", produced by L.A. Jay and SlimKid3. Track listing and production information is taken from the album's liner notes.

Personnel 
All information is taken from the album's liner notes.

 The Pharcyde – Co-Producer, Background Vocals, Creative Direction
 Fatlip – Lead Vocals, Scratching
 SlimKid 3 – Lead Vocals, Producer
 Imani – Lead Vocals
 Bootie Brown – Lead Vocals
 J-Swift – Producer, Piano, Bass, Rhodes, Background Vocals, Scratching
 L.A. Jay – Producer
 Buckwheat – Vocals
 Quinton – Vocals
 Rahsaan – Background Vocals
 Greg Padilla – Background Vocals
 Brandon Padilla – Background Vocals
 Cedra Walton – Background Vocals
 Eric Sarafin – Engineer, Mix Engineer

 Joe Primeau – Mix Engineer
 Al Phillips – Additional Engineer
 Doug Boehm – Additional Engineer
 James Mansfield – Additional Engineer
 Jim Ervin – Additional Engineer
 JMD – Drums
 Michael Ross – Executive Producer
 Lamarr Algee – A&R
 Leslie Cooney – A&R Coordinator, Background Vocals
 PMP Mgt. – Management
 Paul Stewart – Management
 Street Knowledge – Management
 Slick K2S/ Fuct – Art Direction, Artwork
 Mark Heimback-Nielsen – Package Design
 Block – Photography

Chart history

Album chart positions 
All chart positions from Billboard magazine (North America).

Singles chart positions 
All chart positions from Billboard magazine (North America).

Certifications

Accolades 
Information is taken from Acclaimed Music.(*) designates lists which are unordered.

References

Citations 
   Rolling Stone Album Guide: Completely Revised and Updated 4th Edition. Simon & Schuster, 2004.  (Note 1, see page 634)

External links 
Bizarre Ride II the Pharcyde at Discogs

1992 debut albums
Delicious Vinyl albums
The Pharcyde albums